Hydnopolyporus is a genus of two species of fungi. The genus was circumscribed in 1962 by English mycologist Derek Reid with H. fimbriatus as the type species.

Although traditionally classified in the family Meripilaceae, recent molecular phylogenetic analysis supports the placement of Hydnopolyporus  in the Irpicaceae.

References

Irpicaceae
Polyporales genera
Taxa described in 1962
Taxa named by Derek Reid